Hella Henrietta Pick CBE (born 24 April 1929) is a British-Austrian journalist of Austrian descent.

Biography
Hella Pick was born in Vienna, Austria, into a middle-class Jewish family. Her parents divorced when she was three years old and she was brought up by her mother. Following Germany's annexation of Austria in 1938, and a visit from the Gestapo, Pick's mother decided to leave Austria. Pick was put on a Kindertransport and arrived in Britain in March 1939. Her mother obtained a visa and joined her three months later.

Pick attended school in the Lake District and learned English. Feeling awkward about her identity, for a while she refused to speak German at all, even with her mother. In 1948, Pick became a British citizen and she no longer felt herself to be a refugee.

Pick studied at the London School of Economics. She applied for a job at the United Nations, but was not accepted.
In 1960, she became the UN correspondent of  The Guardian newspaper, where she was tutored by its chief US correspondent Alistair Cooke. At the time there were very few women correspondents, and women were disadvantaged and not treated as equals; for example, at ambassadorial dinners the women withdrew after the meal as was long the custom in the English-speaking world, while the men—including Pick's colleagues and competitors—discussed events over port and cigars. She has also written for the New Statesman. She was honoured with a CBE in 2000 for her work as a journalist and writer. In Germany she became known for her appearance on the TV shows Internationales Frühschoppen and Presseclub.

Pick is the Arts & Culture Programme Director at the Institute for Strategic Dialogue, an independent think-tank based in London. She has dual British and Austrian citizenship, and regularly visits Austria, her "home away from home".

The Guardian News & Media Archive contains an oral history of her time on the paper in the 1960s and 1970s and a written memoir. Invisible Walls, an account of her life and career in journalism, was published in 2021.

Bibliography
Simon Wiesenthal: A Life in Search of Justice, Weidenfeld & Nicolson, 1996 
Guilty Victim - Austria from the Holocaust to Haider, I B Tauris & Co Ltd, 2000
Invisible Walls, Weidenfeld & Nicolson, 2021

References

External links
 Imperial War Museum Interview

1929 births
Living people
Jewish emigrants from Austria to the United Kingdom after the Anschluss
English journalists
Kindertransport refugees
Commanders of the Order of the British Empire
The Guardian journalists
Naturalised citizens of the United Kingdom